Home Before Dark is the twenty-seventh studio album by American singer-songwriter Neil Diamond. Released on May 5, 2008, it was the artist's second album for American Recordings.

Home Before Dark received generally positive reviews from critics upon its release and topped the national albums charts in the United States, the United Kingdom, and New Zealand. It has since been accredited with album certifications in several regions.

In May 2008, at the age of 67, Neil Diamond was the oldest performer to have a number one record. This mark was previously held by Bob Dylan in 2006 with his Modern Times album, released when he was 65. However, Bob Dylan's 2009 album, Together Through Life, earned Dylan that position again, because Dylan released his most recent work at 67 years and 11 months compared to Diamond's releasing Home Before Dark at 67 years and 3 months.

The album is Diamond's second to be produced by Rick Rubin, a producer of hip-hop and heavy metal music, who had discovered a talent for re-invigorating the careers of musicians when he produced Aerosmith and a string of albums with Johnny Cash. After Cash's death, Diamond became the next artist to find his career given a shot in the arm via Rubin's production on his 2005 album 12 Songs. The album consists of original works and some remakes and was mixed by Dana Nielsen. The orchestral parts were arranged and conducted by David Campbell

Track listing 
All songs were written by Neil Diamond, except where noted.
 "If I Don't See You Again" – 7:13
 "Pretty Amazing Grace" – 4:53
 "Don't Go There" – 6:04
 "Another Day (That Time Forgot)" (feat. Natalie Maines) – 6:12
 "One More Bite of the Apple" – 6:39
 "Forgotten" – 4:22
 "Act Like a Man" – 4:04
 "Whose Hands Are These" – 3:12
 "No Words" – 4:49
 "The Power of Two" – 4:35
 "Slow It Down" – 4:56
 "Home Before Dark" – 6:00
 "Without Her" (Harry Nilsson) – 4:22
 Deluxe Edition Bonus Track
 "Make You Feel My Love" (Bob Dylan) – 4:38
 Deluxe Edition Bonus Track

Deluxe Edition Bonus DVD 
 "Pretty Amazing Grace"
 "If I Don't See You Again"
 "Forgotten"
 "The Boxer" (Paul Simon)

Personnel 
 Neil Diamond – lead vocals, guitar 
 Mike Campbell – guitar, bass guitar 
 Smokey Hormel – guitar, bass guitar 
 Jonny Polonsky – guitar 
 Matt Sweeney – guitar 
 Benmont Tench – keyboards 
 Marvin B. Gordy – timpani 
 David Campbell – horn, string and woodwind arrangements; orchestra leader
 Charlie Bisharat – concertmaster 
 Susie Katayama – orchestra contractor 
 Rose Corrigan – bassoon 
 Ralph Williams – clarinet
 Earl Dumler – English horn, oboe
 Dan Higgins – flute
 Larry Klimas – flute (12)
 Steve Kujala – flute
 Robert Shulgold – flute
 Don Markese – alto flute (12)
 Nathan Campbell – French horn
 Joe Meyer – French horn
 Steven Holtman – trombone 
 Bill Reichenbach, Jr. – trombone
 Chuck Findley – trumpet 
 Gary Grant – trumpet 
 Doug Tornquist – tuba
 Larry Corbett – cello
 Rudy Stein – cello
 David Stone – double bass 
 Andrew Duckles – viola
 Armen Garabedian – violin
 Julian Hallmark – violin
 Linda Press – backing vocals (3)
 Julia Waters – backing vocals (3)
 Maxine Waters – backing vocals (3)
 Natalie Maines – lead vocals (4)

Production 
 Producer – Rick Rubin
 Production Coordination – Lindsay Chase and Sam Cole
 Recorded by Greg Fidelman and Andrew Scheps
 Additional Recording – Bernie Becker, Jason Lader and Dana Nielsen.
 Assistant Engineers – Phillip Broussard, Chris Holmes and Jim "Bud" Monti.
 Recorded at Arch Angel Studios and Akademie Mathematique of Philosophical Sound Research (Los Angeles, CA); Conway Studios (Hollywood, CA); Punkerpad West (Van Nuys, CA); 
 Mixed by Dana Nielsen at Little People Studio (Los Angeles, CA).
 Mastered by Vlado Meller and Mark Santangelo at Universal Mastering Studios (New York, NY).
 Art Direction – Mary Maurer
 Design – Mary Maurer and Michael Lau-Robles
 Photography – Jesse Diamond

Charts

Weekly charts

Year-end charts

Certifications

References 

2008 albums
Neil Diamond albums
Columbia Records albums
Albums produced by Rick Rubin